Damon Santostefano (born August 15, 1959) is an American film director and screenwriter.  He is best known for directing the 1999 Warner Brothers feature film Three to Tango starring Matthew Perry, Neve Campbell and Dylan McDermott; Bring It On Again; and the television series Clueless.

Biography
Santostefano was performing stand-up comedy in his hometown of Boston during his teens. While attending New York University Film School he began working professionally as a director, creating award-winning short films and documentaries. After college, he established a production company where he developed and directed film and television projects for HBO, Showtime, PBS and Paramount Television. He also directed several Off-Broadway stage productions including award-winning plays at The American Place Theatre. For the BAM Festival, he directed Stockhausen's contemporary opera Leben.

Santostefano began a screenwriting career upon selling his first screenplay to Columbia Pictures and has since written and co-written screenplays for several studios.

Filmography (as director)

Film
Fright Show (1985)
Scream Greats, Vol. 1 - "Tom Savini, Master of Horror Effects" (1986)
Scream Greats, Vol. 2 - "Satanism and Witchcraft" (1986)
Severed Ties (1992)
Three to Tango (1999)
Another Cinderella Story (2008)
Last Man Running (2003)
Bring It On Again (2004)
Best Player (2011)
A Cinderella Story: Once Upon a Song (2011)
Pure Country: Pure Heart (2017)

Television
The Adventures of Pete & Pete - episode "Yellow Fever" (1994)
Bob and Sully (1995) 
Skwids (1996)  
Clueless (1996) 
The High Life (1996)  
Honey, I Shrunk the Kids: The TV Show (1997)  
The War Next Door (2000) 
The District - episode "Rage Against the Machine" (2001)

Writer – filmography
Last Man Running (2003)

Awards
CableACE Award – Best Series (The Adventures of Pete and Pete)

Personal life
Santostefano was engaged to actress Mary Stuart Masterson in 1999. They married in 2000, and divorced in 2004. He is the former son-in-law of Peter Masterson and Carlin Glynn.

References

External links
Damon Santostefano official site

American male screenwriters
American film producers
American film directors
Place of birth missing (living people)
Living people
Tisch School of the Arts alumni
1959 births